Álvaro Gutiérrez Pelscher (born 21 July 1968) is a Uruguayan football manager and former player who played as a midfielder.

Gutiérrez played 38 times for the Uruguay national team between 1991 and 1997, being a part of the Uruguay team that won the Copa América in 1995. He started his playing career in 1988 with Bella Vista. In 1990, he was part of the team that won their first and only league title. In 1992, he joined Nacional where he was part of the championship winning team in 1992.

After being part of the Copa América winning team in 1995 he was signed by Spanish team Real Valladolid where he played until 1998. He then had a short spell with Rayo Vallecano before returning to Bella Vista in 1999.

Gutiérrez played for Liverpool de Montevideo in 2000 and then returned to Spain Sporting de Gijón which was his last club.

Honours

Player

Club
Bella Vista
Uruguayan Primera División: 1990

Nacional
Uruguayan Primera División: 1992

International
Uruguay
Copa América: 1995

Manager
Nacional
Uruguayan Primera División: 2014–15, 2019

References

External links
 
 Profile at Tenfield 
 
 Álvaro Gutiérrez at Footballdatabase

1968 births
Living people
Footballers from Montevideo
Uruguayan footballers
Uruguay international footballers
1991 Copa América players
1993 Copa América players
1995 Copa América players
Association football midfielders
Uruguayan Primera División players
La Liga players
Segunda División players
C.A. Bella Vista players
Club Nacional de Football players
Liverpool F.C. (Montevideo) players
Real Valladolid players
Rayo Vallecano players
Sporting de Gijón players
Uruguayan expatriate footballers
Expatriate footballers in Spain
Copa América-winning players
Club Nacional de Football managers
C.A. Rentistas managers
Uruguayan Primera División managers
Al Shabab FC (Riyadh) managers
L.D.U. Quito managers
Uruguayan football managers
Club Olimpia managers
Club Universitario de Deportes managers
Uruguayan expatriate football managers
Rampla Juniors managers